Margit Söderholm (1905–1986) was a Swedish writer. Her prize-winning 1943 historical romance novel Sunshine Follows Rain was adapted into a 1946 film of the same title. Her 1954 novel Clouds Over Hellesta was made into a 1956 film.

Selected works
 Sunshine Follows Rain (1943)
 All the World's Delights (1946)
 Meeting in Vienna (1951)
 Clouds Over Hellesta (1953)

References

Bibliography 
 Gunnar Iverson, Astrid Soderbergh Widding & Tytti Soila. Nordic National Cinemas. Routledge, 2005.

Further reading 
 

1905 births
1986 deaths
Writers from Stockholm
20th-century Swedish women writers
Swedish novelists